Jan Mauritz Boklöv (born 14 April 1966) is a Swedish former ski jumper who won the 1988–89 World Cup season. He also dominated the Swedish national championships during the late 1980s and early 1990s. He is best known for popularising the now-ubiquitous V-style in the late 1980s and early 1990s.

Kurt Elimä was one of Boklöv's trainers. Boklöv competed in two Winter Olympics, finishing seventh in the team large hill event in Calgary in 1988 and 47th in the individual normal hill in Albertville in 1992. At the 1989 Ski Jumping World Championships in Lahti, he finished fifth in the team large hill and tenth in the individual normal hill events. At the 1990 Ski Flying World Championships in Vikersund, Boklöv finished 27th.

In 1989 he was the recipient of the Jerringpriset, a prize for the best sports performance of the year by a Swedish athlete, as voted for by the radio audience of Radiosporten.

During the early 2000s he lived in Luxembourg., and as of 2016, he is living in Brussels together with his family.

World Cup competition victories

Swedish national champion
Normal hill (K70): 1985, 1986, 1987, 1989
Large hill (K90): 1986, 1988, 1989, 1990

References

External links
 

1966 births
Living people
People from Gällivare Municipality
Swedish male ski jumpers
Ski jumpers at the 1988 Winter Olympics
Ski jumpers at the 1992 Winter Olympics
Olympic ski jumpers of Sweden
Sportspeople from Norrbotten County